A Virtual Facility (VF) is a highly realistic digital representation of a data center. 

The term virtual in Virtual Facility refers to the use of the word as in Virtual Reality rather than the abstraction of computer resources as in platform virtualization. The VF mirrors the characteristics of the physical facility over time and allows modeling all relevant characteristics of a physical data center with a high degree of precision.

VF Model includes

 Three-dimensional physical facility layout
 Network connectivity of facility equipment
 Full inventory of facility equipment, including electronics and electrical systems such as Power Distribution Units (PDU’s) and Uninterruptible Power Supplies (UPS’s)
 Full air conditioning system (ACU’s) and controls within the room

The term Virtual Facility was introduced by Future Facilities, a data centre design consultancy focused on delivering Design and Operational solutions to address the emerging environmental problems facing the modern Mission Critical Facility (MCF). The concept is in essence a convergence of the fields of Virtual Reality (VR), Computer Simulation and Expert Systems, applied to the specific domain of facilities.

The VF type of computer simulation allows detailed analysis and prototyping of air flow in the data center by making use of Computational Fluid Dynamics (CFD) techniques. This in turn allows the air flow and temperatures of the facility to be analyzed visually (Scientific Visualisation) and numerically to study and predict what will happen in the real facility. The importance of scientific methods in design of mission critical facilities has become a necessity, since the performance gains predicted by Moore's Law go hand in hand with a rise in power and heat dissipated by equipment. Rules of thumb have proven to be no longer adequate.

VF design purposes

 Green field design
 Asset management
 Troubleshooting existing data centers
 Making existing data centers more resilient
 Making existing data centers more energy efficient
 Cost prediction
 Staff training
 Capacity planning
 Load growth management
 
The VF is now being employed by many large organizations as a way of virtually assessing a situation before having to spend huge sums of money trying to solve a problem in the real facility.

It is essential to know whether adding new equipment or changing equipment will cause a logistical or thermal problem.  The VF allows the designer or operator to assess the best course of action and gives in depth understanding on unintuive behaviours.

References

 

Data management